Heber-Percy is a surname. Notable people with the surname include: 

Algernon Heber-Percy (born 1944), British landowner, farmer, and public official
Robert Heber-Percy (1911–1987), English eccentric, "the Mad Boy"

Compound surnames